Ilija Mitic (born July 19, 1940, in Belgrade, Kingdom of Yugoslavia) is a former Serbian American professional soccer player.  He was a star of the North American Soccer League, its 7th all-time leading scorer with 239 points in 166 games, including 101 goals. Mitić was the first soccer player to score 100 goals in the NASL, in July 1978 vs Memphis.

Mitic played with Partizan Belgrade as they won the Yugoslav championship in 1960–61.  Earning 2 U-23 caps and 8 youth caps, he later joined OFK Belgrade.

Mitic signed with the Oakland Clippers of the newly formed National Professional Soccer League in 1967, won the league title, and was named to the NPSL's Best XI team. In the off-season, the NPSL merged with the United Soccer Association to form the NASL.  With the Clippers he was the NASL's 3rd leading scorer in 1968 and again a Best XI selection.  Mitic joined the Dallas Tornado as the Clippers folded and was named a Best XI for the third consecutive year in 1969.  Converting from forward to midfielder, Mitic was also chosen as an NASL Best XI in 1973 and 1974.  He played indoor soccer for the Tornado as well, and was named to the All-Tournament team in 1975.

Traded after playing 3 games in 1975, he finished his NASL career with the San Jose Earthquakes and is the league's sixth all-time leading goal scorer.  He played one 'A' international for the United States national soccer team, on August 10, 1973, at Candlestick Park, as the U.S. lost to Poland 0–4 in a friendly.

References

Sources
 
 
 Profile at OM1899
 NASL stats at Nasljeseys.

1940 births
Living people
Yugoslav footballers
Serbian footballers
United States men's international soccer players
Serbian emigrants to the United States
Association football midfielders
FK Partizan players
OFK Beograd players
FK Bor players
Yugoslav First League players
Olympique de Marseille players
Ligue 1 players
FC Den Bosch players
Indoor soccer players
National Professional Soccer League (1967) players
Oakland Clippers players
North American Soccer League (1968–1984) players
North American Soccer League (1968–1984) indoor players
Dallas Tornado players
San Jose Earthquakes (1974–1988) players
Expatriate footballers in France
Expatriate footballers in the Netherlands
American soccer players
American expatriate soccer players
Footballers from Belgrade
American expatriate sportspeople in France
American expatriate sportspeople in the Netherlands
SVV Scheveningen players